Dorcadion decipiens is a species of beetle in the family Cerambycidae. It was described by Ernst Friedrich Germar in 1824. It is known from Romania, Hungary, Serbia, Slovakia (from which it is considered to be extinct), Moldova, and Ukraine.

References

decipiens
Beetles described in 1824